Indothais is a genus of sea snails, marine gastropod mollusks, in the family Muricidae, the murex snails or rock snails.

Species
Species within the genus Indothais include:
 Indothais blanfordi (Melvill, 1893)
 Indothais dubia (Schepman, 1919)
 Indothais gradata (Jonas, 1846)
 Indothais guglielmii T. Cossignani, 2019
 Indothais javanica (Philippi, 1848)
 Indothais lacera (Born, 1778)
 Indothais malayensis (Tan & Sigurdsson, 1996)
 Indothais pinangensis (K. S. Tan & Sigurdsson, 1996)
 Indothais rufotincta (K. S. Tan & Sigurdsson, 1996)
 Indothais sacellum (Gmelin, 1791)
 Indothais scalaris (Schubert & J. A. Wagner, 1829)
 Indothais wutingi (Tan, 1997)

References

 
Gastropods described in 2013